Emily Nokes is a writer, artist, music critic and musician. She has been the singer of the feminist pop-punk band Tacocat since 2007. She is also the music editor for Bust Magazine, and the former music editor at The Stranger from 2012 to 2015.

Early life 
Nokes is from Butte, Montana and started writing songs when she was a child.

She moved to Seattle when she was 19 to become a graphic designer. She attended The Seattle Art Institute where she met the bandmates who would later form Tacocat.

Career

Music 
Nokes is the lead singer, tambourine player and a songwriter for Tacocat. Her creative process involves writing down snippets of ideas in a notebook and workshopping them with other bandmates into full songs.When it’s time to start making new music, my bandmates usually get together and hash together instrumental ideas that they’ll show me via phone recording or practice jam. I then just start thinking about melodies and seeing if any of the lyrics fit, keeping the feeling of the music versus the feeling of the lyrics in mind, though I don’t mind (and sometimes prefer) sad-sounding music paired with silly lyrics or upbeat music paired with darker lyrics. It’s a fun little jigsaw puzzle for each song! Sometimes it snaps together right away, sometimes you have to tinker with it for weeks.As part of Tacocat, Nokes has received recognition from peers and critics alike, including The Seattle Times, Pitchfork and the AV Club. La Sera's Katy Goodman has called Tacocat "the best band in the world."

Politics 
Nokes identifies as a feminist and her songs address topics from catcalling to menstruation. She is an activist for queer, anti-racist, and anti-transphobic causes, especially with regards to art:We need to demand more from everything all the time — for women, for queer folks, for trans folks, for people of color, and for everyone else who lives outside of the standard-issue, mostly-white/mostly-male representation across all platforms of expression.

Personal life 
She is a Libra, has a grey cat named Tinsel, and lives on Capitol Hill, a neighborhood in Seattle, Washington.

She has said that if she weren't in a band, she would want to be a candy taster.

References 

Year of birth missing (living people)
Living people
American magazine editors
Women magazine editors
American women editors
American women music critics
American music critics
American punk rock singers
American women artists
American women writers
Feminist musicians
21st-century American women
Women punk rock singers